Nelson de la Rosa Martínez ( – October 22, 2006),  Mahow, was a Dominican actor and one of the shortest men of the 20th and 21st centuries. Nelson measured 71 centimeters tall (about 2 feet 4 inches).

Acting career
De la Rosa starred in the 1987 feature Italian horror film made in Dominican Republic called Ratman. During the 1990s Nelson continued his path to international success by becoming a staple guest at Venevision's television show Súper Sábado Sensacional in Venezuela, and, later on, he would be invited as a guest to Don Francisco's show, Sábado Gigante, and to other Univision shows. His popularity took him to other Hispanic countries such as Argentina, where he featured several times in Susana Giménez show, Puerto Rico, Mexico, Spain and others. He married, and had a son.

He had a minor role in the poorly received remake The Island of Dr. Moreau, where he shared scenes with Marlon Brando, among others. This role is said to be the inspiration for the Austin Powers movie character Mini-Me, as well as Kevin who accompanies Dr. Alphonse Mephisto in South Park.  Another very popular appearance was in the video for the song Coolo by the Argentine hip hop group Illya Kuryaki and the Valderramas. De la Rosa had been approached by many American media operators and television shows, such as ESPN and others, for a feature about his life. So far, however, no plans to film a documentary about him have been completed.

Life
De la Rosa befriended then Boston Red Sox pitcher and fellow Dominican, Pedro Martínez, who began to take de la Rosa to playoff games as a good luck charm during the 2004 MLB playoffs.

He was a main attraction in the "Hermanos Mazzini" and "Las Águilas Humanas" circuses, which marketed him as the Guinness World Record-holder for world's smallest man at 54 cm (21.25 inches), though this organization does not endorse this claim.

Death
He died at the age of 38, October 22, 2006, in Providence, Rhode Island, USA, reportedly from heart failure. He is survived by his wife, Jennifer De Leonel, and son who was 9. His remains were transferred to the Dominican Republic, and buried in the Cristo Redentor cemetery.

References

External links

1968 births
2006 deaths
Hispanic and Latino American male actors
Dominican Republic male film actors
Actors with dwarfism
Entertainers with dwarfism
Dominican Republic emigrants to the United States
American male actors